The 2005 Biathlon Junior World Championships was held in Kontiolahti, Finland from March 14 to March 20, 2005. There was to be a total of 16 competitions: sprint, pursuit, individual, and relay races for men and women.

Medal winners

Youth Women

Junior Women

Youth Men

Junior Men

Medal table

References

External links
Official IBU website 

Biathlon Junior World Championships
2005 in biathlon
2005 in Finnish sport
International sports competitions hosted by Finland
2005 in youth sport